The following is a partial list of family-owned newspapers in the United States.  It represents the small subset of the list of newspapers in the United States which are run by a family business, and may include exceptions to or examples of concerns about concentration of media ownership.

A - L
 The Adair County Free Press, Greenfield, Iowa – established 1889 by the Sidey family, still in operation
 The Argus-Press, Owosso, Michigan – established 1916
 The Bangor Daily News, Bangor, Maine – family-owned since 1889
 The Barre-Montpelier Times Argus – Barre Times and Montpelier Argus, both est. 1897, merged in 1959, owned by Mitchell family since 1964
 The Bourbon County Citizen – family-owned and operated by the Brannnon family in Paris, Kentucky
 The Caledonian-Record – family-owned and operated by the Smith family in St. Johnsbury, Vermont
 Casa Grande Valley Newspapers Inc., Casa Grande, Arizona – family-owned and operated by the Kramer family since 1963
 The Chronicle, Centralia, WA — established in 1889, owned by the Taylor family, Chad & Coralee Taylor (CT Publishing LLC)
 The Citizen-Advertiser – TMC publication, family-owned and operated by the Brannnon family in Paris, Kentucky
 The Clayton Record, Clayton, Alabama – family-owned since 1915
 The Columbian, Vancouver, Washington – owned by the Campbell family since 1921
 The Commercial Dispatch, Columbus, Mississippi – family-owned since 1922
 Cortland Standard, Cortland, New York—family-owned since 1876
 The Daily Gazette, Scnenectady, NY-Owned by the Hume family
 The Daily Standard, Celina, Ohio - family-owned since 1848
 The Durango Herald, Durango, Colorado – owned by the Ballantine family
 East Oregonian – Oregon and Washington papers, family-owned
 The Elkhart Truth, Elkhart, Indiana – family-owned since 1889
 ’’The Emporia Gazette’’ Emporia, Kansas — family-owned since 1895
 Grants Pass Daily Courier, Grants Pass, Oregon — owned by the Voorhies family since 1897 
 Greenville Journal, Greenville, South Carolina -- family-owned since 1999
 The Hardwick Gazette, Hardwick, Vermont – established 1889
 The Italian Tribune, aka La Tribuna del Popolo, Macomb, Michigan – founded 1909, family-owned since 1909 by the Giuliano-Baker family
 The Journal, Cortez, Colorado – owned by the Ballantine family
 The Keene Sentinel, Keene, New Hampshire – family-owned since 1799
The Lincoln County News, Newcastle, Maine – owned by the Erskine and Roberts Family since 1920
 The Lewiston Tribune, Lewiston, Idaho - owned by the Alford family 
 Kstati Russian-American Newspaper, aka Apropos Kstati, San Francisco, California – founded in 1994, family-owned and operated by the Sundeyev family

M - Z
 The Madison Courier, Madison, Indiana – founded 1837, owned since 1849 by the Garber family
 The Marysville Journal-Tribune, Marysville, Ohio – continuously operating as family-owned since 1849 
 The Mooreland Leader, Mooreland, Oklahoma – Schnoebelen family-owned since 1903
 News-Register, McMinnville, Oregon – family-owned since 1928
 The Newtown Bee, Newtown, Connecticut – family-owned since 1881
 Press Enterprise, Bloomsburg, Pennsylvania – family-owned since 1902
 Polk County News, Benton, Ducktown, Copperhill TN- local family-owned since 1883
 The Rome Sentinel Company, Rome, New York – started in the 1820s, family-owned since 1864
 The Roswell Daily Record, Roswell, New Mexico – started in 1891, family-owned
 The Rutland Herald, Rutland, Vermont – started in 1794, family-owned entire history, Mitchell family since 1947
 The Villages Daily Sun, started in 1997, family owned.
 Shaw Newspapers, Dixon, Illinois – established in 1851
 Smith Publishing & Media Group, Walnut, California – family-owned since 2006
Sonoma West Publishers (Sonoma West Times & News, The Healdsburg Tribune, The Cloverdale Reveille, and the Windsor Times)
 The Southern Star, Ozark, Alabama – family-owned since 1867
 The Spokesman-Review, Spokane, Washington – family-owned and published by the Cowles family since 1894
 Steamboat Pilot & Today, Routt County, Colorado – owned by WorldWest LLC, a family-owned company based in Lawrence, Kansas
 Sun Journal, Lewiston, Maine – family-owned and published by the Costello family since 1898
 Town Topics, Princeton, New Jersey – family-owned since 1946
 Town Tribune, New Fairfield, Connecticut – family-owned
 Valley India Times – Indo-American newspaper, Dholakia family-owned since 2000
 Weeklys— Formerly Metro Newspapers, established in 1985 in San Jose, California.
 Wick Communications, Sierra Vista, Arizona – Wick family-owned chain of newspapers in 12 states since 1926

References

Lists of newspapers published in the United States
 
 Newspapers